Bethune: The Making of a Hero is a 1990 biographical period drama film directed by Phillip Borsos. The film is about the life and death of Norman Bethune, a Canadian physician who served as a combat surgeon during the Chinese Civil War. The cast includes Donald Sutherland as Bethune, Helen Mirren as Frances Penny Bethune, Colm Feore as Chester Rice, and Anouk Aimée as Marie-France Coudaire.

Ted Allan, who met Bethune before his death, attempted to make a film about Bethune starting in 1942. He presented scripts to 20th Century Fox, Edward Lewis, Columbia Pictures, and Warner Bros. from the 1940s to the 1970s. John Kemeny and Denis Héroux attempted to produce the film with the aid of the Chinese in the 1980s, but failed due to financial difficulties. Nicolas Clermont and Pieter Kroonenburg, the operators of Filmline, bought the script after Allan's daughter showed it to them. Borsos was selected to direct the film after Ted Kotcheff left over payment disputes.

The film was in production for five years and was the most expensive film in Canadian history at the time. It was an international coproduction between Canada, France, and China. The film was shot in China with the aid of the August First Film Studio in 1987, but financial problems halted production for a year, and shooting was completed by 23 December 1988. The Canadian government's support for the film waned after the Tiananmen Square massacre. The authorship of the film is in dispute; Borsos and Sutherland claim that Dennis Clark rewrote Allan's script, which was "pretentious and two-dimensional and unplayable", according to Sutherland.

The film's long production time delayed its release by two years and caused it to miss its scheduled premiere at the opening of the 1989 Montreal World Film Festival. The film was shown at the 1990 Montreal World Film Festival but failed in its theatrical release before being shown on television as a four-hour miniseries. The film's troubled production was chronicled in Bob McKeown's Strangers in a Strange Land, which was shown at the 1988 Toronto International Film Festival, one of the attempted premiere sites for Bethune: The Making of a Hero.

Cast
 Donald Sutherland as Norman Bethune
 Helen Mirren as Frances Penny Bethune
 Helen Shaver as Mrs. Dowd
 Colm Feore as Chester Rice
 James Pax as Mr. Tung
 Guo Da as Dr. Chian
 Anouk Aimée as Marie-France Coudaire
 Ronald Pickup as Alan Coleman
 Geoffrey Chater as Dr. Clifford Archibald
 Tan Zong-Yao as General Nieh
 Yvan Ponton as Franc Coudaire
 Zhang Ke-Yaw as Mao Zedong
 Iñaki Aierra as Dr. Salvador
 Sophie Faucher as Nurse Mackenzie
 Lang Li Hai as Hsiao
 Michael Sinelnikoff as Dr. Keller
 James Hong as Leung

Production

Preproduction

Ted Allan met Norman Bethune at age 18 and started writing about him in 1940. The two last met in 1937, and Bethune died from blood poisoning in China in 1939. In 1942, Allan sold his 185-page script based on the life of Bethune to 20th Century Fox for around USD$25,000, but the film was not produced. He and Sydney Gordon wrote The Scalpel, the Sword: The Story of Doctor Norman Bethune in 1952.

From the 1940s to 1970s the title of the script changed between Bethune, Lifetide, The Long March, and Making of a Hero. Columbia Pictures and Warner Bros. considered producing the script. Allan wrote a script for Edward Lewis in 1969, but it was not produced. Between 1975 and 1978 Allan presented four versions of the script to Columbia after the success of Lies My Father Told Me, but none were produced. Lewis also commissioned a script from Gordon and Otto Preminger wanted to produce it despite it not being written. Allan refused to sell his rights stating that "I didn't want Preminger to direct it". Allan bought his script back from 20th Century Fox after being commissioned by Lewis. CAN$10,000 was invested by the Canadian Film Development Corporation into Ted Allan's first-draft script in 1976. John Kemeny secured additional investment from Columbia. Allan, Norman Jewison, Kemeny, and Michael Spencer travelled to China, with CFDC funding.

In June 1980, Kemeny and Denis Héroux announced a plan to create Bethune-The Long March on a budget of $25 million. Ted Kotcheff was attached to direct the film. Kemeny and Kotcheff tried to negotiate a deal with the China Film Corporation and August First Film Studio. Filming was meant to start in February 1981, but financial troubles resulted in the rights reverting to Allan. Kemeny left the project in 1984.

Nicolas Clermont and Pieter Kroonenburg became involved in 1985, after being shown the script by Allan's daughter Julie, who worked for their company Filmline. Filmline purchased the script for $5,000. Julie also negotiated with the Chinese government and the film was given support from August First Film Studio while the Chinese received the distribution rights for China and eastern Europe. Clermont stated that "What it cost Bertolucci and Spielberg $5 million to $6 million to shoot in China cost us nothing". French producer Jacques Dorfmann joined the production and was given the distribution rights for Europe. According to Kroonenburg the deal with China was worth $3–4 million and aided in filming the movie in five provinces. Chinese screenwriter Li Bai edited the script.

Jewison considered directing the film, but was unable to due to scheduling conflicts. Kotcheff was also attached to direct the film, but left due to payment disputes. Phillip Borsos directed the film. In the 1940s Darryl F. Zanuck wanted Walter Pidgeon to play Bethune. Sean Connery, Richard Dreyfuss, Christopher Plummer, and Robert Redford were interested in playing Bethune, but Donald Sutherland, who previously played Bethune in a CBC Television movie, was selected. Sutherland previously attempted to create a $40 million film based on Roderick Stewart's Bethune biography with Gillo Pontecorvo directing.

An agreement in 1986 divided the budget with $5 million coming from Canada, $3 million from China, and $2 million from France. An agreement signed by Minister of Communications Flora MacDonald and Ai Zhisheng on 23 February 1987, listed the budget of the film as $13.5 million. Hemdale Film Corporation bought the United States distribution rights for $2.5 million and Telefilm invested $8.2 million. The film's budget rose from $11 million to between $15–20 million. It was the most expensive film in Canadian history at the time until Shadow of the Wolf.

Shooting

The film was in production for five years. The film was shot in China from 15 April to 4 August 1987, although filming was halted for one week in May due to the Canadian production crew protesting the poor working conditions. The protest increased the film's budget by $50,000. Further production was halted for a year due to financial problems until Telefilm granted another $2.5 million to the production. Jane Birkin was initially cast to play Frances Bethune, but was unavailable for shooting in Spain and was replaced by Helen Mirren. Shooting was completed in Canada and Spain by 23 December 1988. MacDonald ordered Telefilm to complete the movie at any cost, but the Canadian government's support for the film waned after the Tiananmen Square Massacre.

Bob McKeown produced Strangers in a Strange Land, a documentary about the filming of Bethune: The Making of a Hero in China, and it was shown at the 1988 Toronto International Film Festival. The film cost $200,000, with Filmline and the documentary producers evenly dividing the cost. Filmline refused to approve the documentary airing on television as they felt it was too negative.

Communication issues between the English and Chinese speaking crew troubled the production. Neil Trifunovich, the special effects coordinator, stated that "The Chinese couldn’t understand why we would not blow up a real mule. They wanted to put explosives on the side of the animal’s head." when they were filming a scene of an artillery attack on a mule train. 2,000 extras from villages in Wutai County were used for Bethune's funeral scene.

A Japanese plane could not be found in China for a scene of an attack against Bethune's caravan, but was found in Canada. However, the Chinese could not find somebody to fly it and a foreign pilot would not be allowed to fly over a military sensitive area. A model plane, that arrived months late, was given to the production, but it was destroyed in a test flight. Sutherland stated "Thankfully, the pilot was unhurt".

Allan criticized Sutherland as "egomaniacal" and for wanting the script rewritten. Allan, whose contract with Filmline required his permission to be granted to any script changes, approved Don Miller to be a script doctor while Dennis Miller was hired by Sutherland. Sutherland claimed that "Ted’s script was pretentious and two-dimensional and unplayable" and that the script was rewritten by Dennis Clark, one of the three uncredited writers. Clark also claimed that he wrote the film and stated that "Contractually, I shouldn’t be talking to you, but the producers haven’t paid me for my last year of work, so I have no qualms about it", as he was still owed $30,000 for his work on the film. Borsos stated that there were thirty-three drafts of the film, and that Clark wrote most of the film. Clermont stated that Clark's claims were "totally ridiculous" and that he should either file a union grievance or "shut up".

Clark and Helen Shaver had to pay for their return to Canada from China themselves.

Editing

The edit proposed by Borsos, telling the film in chronological order, was rejected by the producers, Telefilm, and Canadian Broadcasting Corporation in September 1989. The film was instead edited, without the involvement of Borsos, to be shown as a series of flashbacks. Borsos' version of the film was 150 minutes long while the version accepted by the producers was 116 minutes long.

Release
The film was initially planned to be shown at the 1988 Cannes Film Festival and theatrically released in late 1988. Clermont later hoped to have the film shown at the 1988 Toronto International Film Festival. The film was suppose to open the 1989 Montreal World Film Festival, but delays with the musical score shifted it to closing the festival, with Shirley Valentine opening instead, before being removed from the schedule.

The film was not shown at the 1990 Cannes Film Festival as its editing was only finished "10 minutes before" Clermont "got on the plane to Cannes" according to Kroonenburg. The film was shown to around 250 people at a theatre in Cannes, but journalists were not allowed in. The film premiered at the 1990 Montreal World Film Festival on 27 August. Around $2 million was spent by Filmstar on advertising the movie. The film was re-edited and aired on television as a four-hour miniseries on 1–2 January 1992.

Reception
The film was unsuccessful at the box office after making less than $400,000 during its theatrical run. Kevin Thomas, writing in the Los Angeles Times, stated that the film was "an often absorbing and intelligent film biography, boasts one of Donald Sutherland’s best portrayals". Noel Taylor, writing in the Ottawa Citizen, gave the film four stars out of five. Stephen Holden, writing in The New York Times, was critical of the film's non-chronological presentation stating that "the film jumps abruptly back and forth in time and place, with little regard to consistency of tone" and criticized the film for placing Bethune's time in Spain late in the movie despite it occurring before his time in China.

The film won the awards for best feature film, director, art direction, supporting role, and set design at the 10th Atlantic Film Festival. The film was nominated at the 12th Genie Awards for Best Director, Best Cinematography, and Best Art Direction, and won for Best Costume Design.

References

Works cited

Notes

External links
 

Canadian biographical drama films
C/FP Distribution films
1990 films
English-language Canadian films
1990s English-language films
Films directed by Phillip Borsos
1990s Canadian films